The Österreichischer Versuchssenderverband (ÖVSV) (in English, Austrian Amateur Radio Society) is a national non-profit organization for amateur radio enthusiasts in Austria. Key membership benefits of the ÖVSV include the sponsorship of amateur radio operating awards, radio contests, and a QSL bureau for members who regularly communicate with amateur radio operators in other countries. ÖVSV represents the interests of Austrian amateur radio operators before Austrian and international telecommunications regulatory authorities.

The ÖVSV is organized on a federal model, with a Dachverband, the National Umbrella Organisation, nine Landesverbände, the Provincial Associations, and the Austrian Military Radio Society. OEVSV is the national member society representing Austria in the International Amateur Radio Union.

Radiosport 

ÖVSV organizes annually two amateur radio contests:
 The All-OE 40/80m contest and cross-service event, always on May 1
 The All-OE 160m contest in November

See also 
 International Amateur Radio Union

References 

Austria
Non-profit organisations based in Austria
Organizations established in 1921
1921 establishments in Austria
Organisations based in Vienna
Radio in Austria